The 2006–2007 season was Hereford United's 26th season in the Football League.

This was Hereford's first season in the Football League since 1996–97, after they were promoted from the Conference the previous season. All the members of the squad were signed on free transfers, in keeping with previous squads.

In the early part of 2007 Hereford were hovering in mid-table, and a notable 4–1 away win at eventual play-off semi-finalists Lincoln City lifted them to 8th position. But a poor run of form followed, with only 8 points won from the 13 remaining matches, meant that the club dropped as low as 17th, before eventually finishing 16th.

Two former players, Ben Smith and Steve Guinan, returned to the club in the January transfer window.

League Two

FA Cup

League Cup

Football League Trophy

Squad statistics

Transfers

In

Out

Loan in

Loan out

References

Hereford United F.C. seasons
Hereford United